Tsegaye Mekonnen (born 15 June 1995) is an Ethiopian long-distance runner. He won the 2014 Dubai Marathon on his debut. In 2017, he competed in the men's marathon event at the 2017 World Championships in Athletics held in London, England.

References

External links
 

1995 births
Living people
Ethiopian male long-distance runners
Place of birth missing (living people)
Ethiopian male marathon runners
World Athletics Championships athletes for Ethiopia
21st-century Ethiopian people